Pseudocatharylla latiola is a moth in the family Crambidae. It was described by Tie-Mei Chen, Shi-Mei Song and De-Cheng Yuan in 2002. It is found in Heilongjiang, China.

References

Crambinae
Moths described in 2002